Millbrook U.S.A. is an album by Dutch hard rock band Golden Earring, released in 2003 (see 2003 in music). It was named after Millbrook, New York, where the band stayed to record the album. Despite this, the album was not issued in the U.S.

Track listing
All songs written by Hay and Kooymans except where noted.

"The Hammer of Love" – 3:46
"Albino Moon" – 3:54
"Skyscraper Hell of a Town" – 4:18
"A Sound I Never Heard" (Frank Carillo, Kooymans) – 4:45
"Better Off Dead" (Carillo, Kooymans) – 3:55
"Colourblind" – 4:10
"On a Night Like You" – 3:51
"Kingfisher" – 5:19
"Coming in Going Out" (Carillo, Hay, Kooymans) – 3:08
"The Thief" (Carillo, Hay, Kooymans) – 3:46
"Beautiful Blue" – 4:10
"Love Is a Loser (When Lust Comes Around)" – 4:21
"The Last Frontier Hotel" – 3:39

Personnel
George Kooymans - guitar, vocals
Rinus Gerritsen - synthesizer, harmonica, bass, harmonium, Hammond organ, grand piano
Barry Hay - vocals, Flute
Cesar Zuiderwijk - drums

Additional personnel
Frank Carillo - dulcimer, harmonium, background vocals, tamboura, slide guitar, laúd
Birgit Lewis Singers - choir, chorus

Production
Producer: Golden Earring
Engineer: Chris Cubeta
Mixing: Paul Orfino
Mastering: Paul Orfino

Charts

Weekly charts

Year-end charts

References

Golden Earring albums
2003 albums